Jazine Basketball Hall is an indoor sports arena located in Jazine, Zadar, Croatia. The official seating capacity of the arena is 3,500 people. It was opened in 1968 after a construction period of 70 days. It was home of the KK Zadar basketball team until 2008. Tornado Zadar usually positioned itself on eastern stand.

References

External links
Venue information 

Sports venues completed in 1968
Basketball venues in Croatia
Indoor arenas in Croatia
Sport in Zadar
KK Zadar
Buildings and structures in Zadar